Uzelac is a South Slavic surname and it originates from Lika and Krbava, but also from  Dalmatia and Bosanska Krajina. It is predominantly used by ethnic Serbs of the Eastern Orthodox Church.

Meaning 
The surname has a root in the verb "ùzēti" which means "to take (away)" in Serbian and refers to the man who married into his wife's household, rather than taking her to his own, i.e. he was "taken (away)" from his family into another one.

History 

In Spring of 1668 census in Trnovac, Bužim or Smiljan (villages near Gospić, Croatia) there is a record of Novak Uzelac and 5 members of his family. 

Among 12 other families, Uzelac's are one of the first residents and founders of Staro Selo, Lika-Senj County (Old Village) a village near Otočac, Croatia.

In 1696 Bishop Sebastian Glavinić de Glamoć (1630–1697) while visiting Lika and Krbava discovers Serbian Orthodox Priest Nikola Uzelac who was offering his services not only to Serbian Orthodox but also to Roman Catholic people as well. 

In (Plemenski rječnik ličko-krbavske županije) R. Grujic notes that in 1915 census Uzelac's were the largest clan in Lika and Krbava with over 319 families. 
At that time all families who carried the same last name also belonged to the same clan (плеmе, pleme plural: плeмeна, plemena).

In the United States 
Many Uzelac's are also found in the United States, mostly in the states of Indiana, Illinois, and Michigan. First Uzelac's in the states are recorded in 1900 Ellis Island Immigration station. The most famous Uzelac's in the United States are Kristal Uzelac, a retired gymnast, and Elliot Uzelac, former head football coach at Navy and Western Michigan University.

People 
 Tomislav Uzelac - Croatian Computer Scientist
 Milan Uzelac (born 1950), Serbian poet, essayist
 Milan Emil Uzelac (1867 - 1954), Austro-Hungarian Army military commander 
 Elliot Uzelac (born 1941), American football coach
 Kristal Dawn Uzelac (born 1986), American female gymnast
 Slobodan Uzelac (born 1947), Serbian politician in Croatia
 Gregory Uzelac (born 1990), American artist and writer
 Uglješa Uzelac (1938 - 1997), mayor of Sarajevo (1983 - 1985) during 1984 Winter Olympics which took place in Sarajevo

References 
 Plemenski rječnik ličko-krbavske županije. - In Serbo-Croatian
 Karl Kaser - Popis Like i Krbave 1712 - In Serbo-Croatian and German
 O Etnogenezi Stanovnistva Like - In Serbo-Croatian
 Seobe i Naselja u Lici - In Serbian
 Ellis Island/Port of New York Records  - Immigrant inspection station from 1892 until 1954
 From the contents: Sv. Sava Gornjokarlovacki no. 6  - in Serbian

Serbian surnames